Beauchamp Bagenal (1741 – 1 May 1802) was an Irish rake, buck, duelist, and politician.

He was born in County Carlow in 1741, son of Walter Bagenal, and his second wife Eleanor Beauchamp, and inherited the family estates aged 11. Bagenal gained a reputation as a hell-raiser and serial heartbreaker, and was reportedly described as the handsomest man in Ireland. According to Jonah Barrington, on his Grand Tour, Bagenal:

fought a prince, jilted a princess, intoxicated the Doge of Venice, carried off a duchess from Madrid, scaled the walls of a convent in Lisbon and fought a duel in Paris,

The jilted Princess referred to above was Charlotte of Mecklenburg-Strelitz, afterwards married to George III of Great Britain

At his home, Dunleckney, Muine Bheag, County Carlow, he earned the nickname "King" Bagenal based on his lavish entertaining and the autocratic manner with which he ran what was virtually a court. Meals were "primarily drinking bouts. At table, he kept a brace of duelling pistols handy, one for tapping the barrel of claret, the other for dealing with any of his guests who failed to drink enough to send him reeling from the table. Dinner was followed by compulsory all night revels."

Bagenal was less violent than his later reputation. There is no proof that he shot all, or even many, of his guests. He fought as few as a dozen duels, a derisory number compared to the great duellists of his day. One of the twelve was against his own cousin, Bagenal Harvey. Harvey fired first, but missed, to Bagenal's delight. "You damn you villain? Do you know you had like to kill your own godfather? Go back to Dunleckney, you dog, and have a good breakfast ready for us. I only wanted to see if you were stout."

A number of other anecdotes of Bagenal's wildness and eccentricity exist online.

Bagenal was lame, and therefore, when fighting had to lean against a tombstone. He represented Enniscorthy in the Irish House of Commons from 1761 to 1768. He sat then as Member of Parliament (MP) for Carlow County between 1768 and 1776 and again between 1778 and 1783.

By his wife Maria, he had three children; he had at least one illegitimate child, Sarah.

References

1741 births
1802 deaths
18th-century Irish politicians
19th-century Irish politicians
Irish duellists
Irish MPs 1761–1768
Irish MPs 1769–1776
Irish MPs 1776–1783
Politicians from County Carlow
Irish people with disabilities
Members of the Parliament of Ireland (pre-1801) for County Wexford constituencies
Members of the Parliament of Ireland (pre-1801) for County Carlow constituencies